CTM is an initialism that may stand for:

Companies and organizations
 Compagnie de Transports au Maroc, a Moroccan public bus transport company
 Companhia de Telecomunicações de Macau, a Macau telecommunications company
 Confederation of Mexican Workers, a confederation of labor unions

Technology
 Cell Transmission Model, a traffic prediction algorithm
 Chemical transport model, a simulation of atmospheric chemistry and pollution
 Close to Metal, a low-level programming interface
 Concepts, Techniques, and Models of Computer Programming, a 2004 textbook
 Corner transfer matrix, a method in statistical mechanics
 Critical thermal maximum, the temperature above which an organism cannot survive
 Current Transformation Matrix, the transformation matrix currently applying in a graphics pipeline
 Certified Technology Manager, an accreditation by ATMAE - Association of Technology, Management and Applied Engineering.

Transport
 Chatham railway station, Kent; National Rail station code
 Chetumal International Airport, Mexico; IATA code
 Kattankulathur railway station, Chengalpattu, India; Indian Railways station code

Other
 Canadian Tire money, a retail loyalty program
 Chaland de transport de matériel, a French landing craft class
 Chicken tikka masala, a curry dish
 Community Trade Mark, now European Union trade mark, a designation for goods or services
 Computational theory of mind, the view that the human mind is best conceived as a computational system
 Corporate travel management, a generic term for corporate travel agencies
 Cretaceous Thermal Maximum, a period of rapid warming in the Cretaceous period
 Cornering the market

See also